The Mines and Minerals Act is a law passed in 1994 in Sierra Leone. It imposed a minimum sentence of 3 years on anyone illegally possessing or smuggling minerals, specifically diamonds as well as authorization to payment to informants up to 40% of the value of the minerals being smuggled.

External links
 Sierra Leone Encyclopedia entry for Mines and Minerals Act

Mines and Minerals Act (1994)
Mining in Sierra Leone
Mines and Minerals Act (1994)